The Life of Klim Samgin  is a 14-part TV series by director Viktor Titov, based on the eponymous novel (1927—1936) by Maxim Gorky. The series premiered on television in March–April 1988.

Plot 
The film describes the life of the Russian intellectual, reluctant revolutionary, in the background Klim Samgin grandiose panorama of Russian life from 1877 to 1917.

Cast
 Andrey Rudensky as Klim Ivanovich Samgin
 Leonid Gorelik as Klim Samgin (in childhood)
 Yelena Solovey as Vera Petrovna,  mother of Klim
 Ernst Romanov as Ivan Akimovich Samgin, father of Klim
 Armen Dzhigarkhanyan as Timofei Stepanovich Varavka, stepfather of Klim
 Sergey Koltakov as Dr. Konstantin Makarov, friend of Klim
 Svetlana Kryuchkova as Lyubov Somova
 Mikhail Gluzsky as Yakov Akimovich Samgin, uncle of Klim
 Natalya Gundareva as Marina Petrovna Zotova (Premirova)
 Andrei Boltnev as gendarme Colonel Popov
 Larisa Guzeeva as Elizaveta Spivak
 Yevgeniya Glushenko as Maria Ivanovna Nikonova
 Alexander Kalyagin as Ivan Mitrofanov / Yakov Kotelnikov, an agent of the secret police
 Igor Vladimirov as Andrey Sergeyevich Prozorov
 Sergei Makovetsky as Dmitri Samghin, brother of Klim
 Andrey Kharitonov as Igor Turoboev
 Victor Kostetskiy as Georgy Gapon
 Valentin Gaft as Valery Trifonov, officer-drunk
 Vladimir Soshalsky as Valentin Bezbedov
 Vsevolod Shilovsky as Zahar Petrovich Berdnikov, businessman
 Aleksei Loktev as Grigory Popov
 Irina Rozanova as Tosya
 Lyubov Sokolova as Anfimovna
 Viktor Bychkov as  beekeeper
 Irina Kupchenko as lady on reception at the lawyer
 Aleksandr Galibin as Diomidov; Nicholas II of Russia
 Andrejs Žagars as Kutuzov

Awards
Honorary Diploma  Manson special  4th episode of  Province. 1886  at the International Film Festival in Monte Carlo (1989).
Professional Award Lenfilm  studio in 1988 the artist Yuri Pugach (1989).

References

External links
 
 Энциклопедия отечественного кино

1988 television films
1988 films
Films directed by Viktor Titov
Films based on works by Maxim Gorky
Films set in Russia
Films shot in Moscow
Films shot in Nizhny Novgorod
Films shot in Saint Petersburg
Lenfilm films
Soviet television films
1980s Soviet television series